is a Japanese biathlete. She competed in the 2014/15 World Cup season, and represented Japan at the Biathlon World Championships 2015 in Kontiolahti. She has represented Japan at both the 2018 PyeongChang Olympics and the 2022 Beijing Olympics.

References

External links 
 

1989 births
Living people
Japanese female biathletes
Olympic biathletes of Japan
Biathletes at the 2018 Winter Olympics
Biathletes at the 2022 Winter Olympics
Asian Games medalists in biathlon
Biathletes at the 2017 Asian Winter Games
Medalists at the 2017 Asian Winter Games
Asian Games bronze medalists for Japan
Sportspeople from Niigata Prefecture
21st-century Japanese women